The Sequio 300 Sequoia is an American two-seat utility or aerobatic aircraft, designed by David Thurston for Sequoia Aircraft Corporation for sale as a kit or set of plans for homebuilding.

Design and development
The Sequioa, derived from the smaller Frati designed F.8 Falco, is a low-wing cantilever monoplane with a retractable tricycle landing gear and
powered by a  Textron Lycoming TIO-540-S1AD turbocharged piston engine, although it was designed to take any Lycoming engine between 235-300 hp (175-224 kW). It has an enclosed cockpit for two with side-by-side seating.

The design was originally proposed in the 1970s but the first prototype did not fly until 26 April 1992 and by 1993 the program was being offered for sale.

Variants
Model 300 Sequoia
Side-by-side seating version.
Model 301 Sequoia
Proposed variant with tandem seating.
Model 302 Kodiak
A proposed four-seat variant with gull-wing doors.

Specifications (Utility)

See also

References

Notes

Bibliography

External links
A cutaway drawing of the Sequoia 300

1990s United States civil utility aircraft
Sequoia
Homebuilt aircraft
Single-engined tractor aircraft
Low-wing aircraft